Chidōkan refers to four different Han schools in Edo period Japan.

Chidōkan (Tsuruoka), the school of the Shōnai Domain
Chidōkan (Tosa), the school of the Tosa Domain
Chidōkan (Hiji), the school of the Hiji Domain
Chidōkan (Ōgaki), the school of the Ōgaki Domain

Domains of Japan